Pyrasia is a genus of moths of the family Crambidae. It contains only one species, Pyrasia gutturalis, which is found in Turkey.

References

Natural History Museum Lepidoptera genus database

Pyraustinae
Crambidae genera
Monotypic moth genera